Rabbanit Michelle Cohen Farber (b. ) is the first woman to lead a Daf Yomi, a multi-year Jewish Talmud study cycle traditionally reserved for men. The women's Daf Yomi led by Farber noted its Siyum HaShas (completion of the Daf Yomi cycle) at the International Convention Center (Binyanei Ha'Uma) in Jerusalem on January 4–5, 2020. Her study group meets at her home in Raanana, Israel.

Farber, an Orthodox Jew, is originally from Lawrence, New York, and emigrated to Israel  1995. She first studied Talmud at age 14 at Yeshivah of Flatbush.  She studied at Barnard College in the U.S., then at Bar-Ilan University in Israel where she received a bachelor's degree in Talmud and Bible. 

Farber co-founded Hadran, an organization to promote Talmud study by women.

She is married to Rabbi Seth Farber, founder and director of the Jewish life advocacy organization, ITIM.

See also
Ilana Kurshan

References

External links

1971 births
American Orthodox Jews
Barnard College alumni
Bar-Ilan University alumni
People from Lawrence, Nassau County, New York
People from Ra'anana
20th-century American women
21st-century American women
Living people